A. V. Vasudevan Potti (born 25 October 1951) is an Indian poet and lyricist who works in Malayalam film industry and Hindu devotional song industry.

Life

Potti was born in Mavelikkara, Alappuzha district, Kerala, India, as the son of A. N. Vasudevan Potti (Athimon Illam) and Devaki Antharjanam (Mannarassala Illam). He began to write poems in various magazines at age 19.

Career

Potti's first album was Mannarassala Nagasthuthikal, released in 1989. He was featured in Thathwamasi, a collection of songs about Ayyappan. He got his first break as a Hindu devotional lyricist on the album Devigeetham, released by Magnasound in 1993.

In 1995 Potti entered the Malayalam film industry with a song for Kakkakkum Poochakkum Kalyanam, directed by Raveendran Maash. Potti also wrote songs for Kannum Khadarum Kannamangalathu, Aala, and others. Potti, who retired as a chief ticket examiner in Indian Railways, now lives in Palakkad, along with his wife Nirmala Devi, with whom he has two sons.

Works
Mannarassala Naagasthuthikal
Thathwamasi
Devigeetham Volume 1
Devigeetham Volume 2
Devigeetham Volume 3

References

External links
List of songs by AV Vasudevan Potti

1951 births
Living people
Malayalam-language lyricists
People from Alappuzha district